Lincoln Village is a census-designated place (CDP) in San Joaquin County, California, United States.  The population was 4,381 at the 2010 census, up from 4,216 at the 2000 census.

Geography
Lincoln Village is located at  (38.004122, -121.334544).

Climate
According to the Köppen Climate Classification system, Lincoln Village has a warm-summer Mediterranean climate, abbreviated "Csa" on climate maps.

Demographics

2010
The 2010 United States Census reported that Lincoln Village had a population of 4,381. The racial makeup of Lincoln Village was 2,971 (67.8%) White, 154 (3.5%) African American, 58 (1.3%) Native American, 269 (6.1%) Asian, 13 (0.3%) Pacific Islander, 536 (12.2%) from other races, and 380 (8.7%) from two or more races. Hispanic or Latino of any race were 1,422 persons (32.5%).

The Census reported that 4,371 people (99.8% of the population) lived in households, 10 (0.2%) lived in non-institutionalized group quarters, and 0 (0%) were institutionalized.

There were 1,565 households, out of which 613 (39.2%) had children under the age of 18 living in them, 750 (47.9%) were opposite-sex married couples living together, 291 (18.6%) had a female householder with no husband present, 101 (6.5%) had a male householder with no wife present.  There were 113 (7.2%) unmarried opposite-sex partnerships, and 9 (0.6%) same-sex married couples or partnerships. 329 households (21.0%) were made up of individuals, and 149 (9.5%) had someone living alone who was 65 years of age or older. The average household size was 2.79.  There were 1,142 families (73.0% of all households); the average family size was 3.25.

The population was spread out, with 1,224 people (27.9%) under the age of 18, 402 people (9.2%) aged 18 to 24, 1,060 people (24.2%) aged 25 to 44, 1,088 people (24.8%) aged 45 to 64, and 607 people (13.9%) who were 65 years of age or older.  The median age was 36.2 years. For every 100 females, there were 90.9 males.  For every 100 females age 18 and over, there were 86.9 males.

The homeowner vacancy rate was 2.1%; the rental vacancy rate was 10.6%.  2,807 people (64.1% of the population) lived in owner-occupied housing units and 1,564 people (35.7%) lived in rental housing units.

2000
As of the census of 2000, there were 4,216 people, 1,569 households, and 1,168 families residing in the CDP. The racial makeup of the CDP was 79.32% White, 2.92% African American, 1.04% Native American, 4.27% Asian, 0.02% Pacific Islander, 6.74% from other races, and 5.69% from two or more races. Hispanic or Latino of any race were 19.00% of the population.

There were 1,569 households, out of which 35.9% had children under the age of 18 living with them, 52.1% were married couples living together, 18.0% had a female householder with no husband present, and 25.5% were non-families. 21.8% of all households were made up of individuals, and 11.0% had someone living alone who was 65 years of age or older.  The average household size was 2.69 and the average family size was 3.12.

In the CDP, the population was spread out, with 29.0% under the age of 18, 6.9% from 18 to 24, 26.6% from 25 to 44, 21.5% from 45 to 64, and 16.1% who were 65 years of age or older.  The median age was 37 years. For every 100 females, there were 87.6 males.  For every 100 females age 18 and over, there were 81.4 males.

The median income for a household in the CDP was $49,940, and the median income for a family was $55,402. Males had a median income of $40,000 versus $30,673 for females. The per capita income for the CDP was $22,115.  About 7.3% of families and 8.4% of the population were below the poverty line, including 15.3% of those under age 18 and 1.0% of those age 65 or over.

References

Census-designated places in San Joaquin County, California
Census-designated places in California